IFK Ölme is a Swedish football club located in Kristinehamn in Värmland County.

Background
Idrottsföreningen Kamraterna Ölme were formed in 1942. The most famous football player to play for IFK Ölme is Magnus "Ölme" Johansson, who played in the Swedish Olympic team in Barcelona in 1992 and the Swedish champions IFK Göteborg.

Since their foundation IFK Ölme has participated mainly in the middle and lower divisions of the Swedish football league system.  The club currently plays in Division 3 Västra Svealand which is the fifth tier of Swedish football. They play their home matches at the Brovallens IP in Kristinehamn. IFK Ölme are able to make use of indoor facilities at the Environiq Arena in Kristinehamn.

IFK Ölme are affiliated to Värmlands Fotbollförbund.

Recent history
In recent seasons IFK Ölme have competed in the following divisions:

2011 – Division III, Västra Svealand
2010 – Division III, Västra Svealand
2009 – Division III, Västra Svealand
2008 – Division III, Västra Svealand
2007 – Division III, Västra Svealand
2006 – Division II, Östra Svealand
2005 – Division II, Västra Götaland
2004 – Division II, Västra Svealand
2003 – Division II, Västra Svealand
2002 – Division II, Västra Svealand
2001 – Division II, Västra Svealand
2000 – Division III, Västra Svealand
1999 – Division III, Västra Svealand
1998 – Division III, Västra Svealand
1997 – Division III, Västra Svealand

Attendances

Select IFK Ölme average attendances:

Footnotes

External links
 IFK Ölme – Official website
 IFK Ölme on Facebook

Football clubs in Värmland County
Association football clubs established in 1942
1942 establishments in Sweden
Idrottsföreningen Kamraterna